Irigwe people (Rigwe: Nneirigwe; Hausa: Miyango) are found mainly in Bassa Local Government Area of Plateau State, Middle Belt (central) Nigeria. They speak the Rigwe language (also Nkarigwe), a Central Plateau language. Their headquarters is the town of Miango, west of the state capital, Jos.

Distribution
Irigwe people are found in Bassa, Jos North and Jos South Local Government Areas of Plateau State and in Kauru Local Government Area of southern Kaduna State, Nigeria.

Culture

Dance
On the dance pattern of the Irigwe, young Irigwe farmers usually leap to encourage the growth of crops at festivals related to the agricultural cycle. Other occupational guilds and professional organizations of experts, like blacksmiths, hunters, or wood-carvers, also possess their own expressive dances. Hunters may also possibly mime the movements of animals as a ritual means of controlling wild beasts and allaying their own fears.

Marriage
Walter H. Sangree wrote:

Leadership
Traditionally, the Irigwe is a segmented society devoid of a centralized political chieftaincy, with the highest authority traditionally accorded to the priestly elders of several tribal subdivisions which are in charge of the "all-important" ritual held for the well-being of the entire group of people or tribe.

Religion
It was reported that a majority of the Irigwe people practice ethnic religion with about 62.0% of the total population, 28.0% being Christian adherents (Independents 55.0%, Protestants 25.0% and Roman Catholic 20.0%), while adherents of the Islamic religion contain the other 10.0% of the population.

References

Ethnic groups in Nigeria